A Goat in the Garden (Swedish: Bock i örtagård) is a 1958 Swedish comedy film directed by Gösta Folke and starring Edvin Adolphson, Gunnel Broström and Eva Stiberg. It was based on the 1933 novel of the same title by Fritiof Nilsson Piraten. It was shot at the Råsunda Studios in Stockholm. The film's sets were designed by the art director P.A. Lundgren.

Cast
 Edvin Adolphson as 	Jon Esping
 Gunnel Broström as	Helfrid
 Eva Stiberg as Elisa Zackrisdotter
 Irma Christenson as 	Mrs. Esping
 Åke Fridell as 	David Jespersson
 Åke Lindström as Johan Vricklund
 Gunnar Sjöberg as	Fabian
 Hugo Björne as 	Vicar Hagel
 Sten Lindgren as The Bishop
 Per Björkman as 	Erik the Vesper
 Claes Thelander as 	The Parson
 Helge Hagerman as 	Nils Åstrandson
 Stina Ståhle as 	Vicar's Wife
 Einar Axelsson as 	Sommerhoff 
 Karl Erik Flens as Lille August 
 Manne Grünberger as 	Jeremias 
 Agda Helin as 	Karolina 
 John Norrman as 	Lutterlögn 
 Bo Samuelsson as Truls 
 Georg Skarstedt as 	Cpl. Krakow

References

Bibliography 
  Costello, Tom. International Guide to Literature on Film. Bowker-Saur, 1994.

External links 
 

1958 films
Swedish comedy films
1958 comedy films
1950s Swedish-language films
Films directed by Gösta Folke
Films based on Swedish novels
1950s Swedish films